Thomas Winfried Menko Pogge (born 13 August 1953) is a German philosopher and is the Director of the Global Justice Program and Leitner Professor of Philosophy and International Affairs at Yale University.  In addition to his Yale appointment, he is the Research Director of the Centre for the Study of the Mind in Nature at the University of Oslo, a Professorial Research Fellow at the Centre for Applied Philosophy and Public Ethics at Charles Sturt University and Professor of Political Philosophy at the University of Central Lancashire's Centre for Professional Ethics. Pogge is also an editor for social and political philosophy for the Stanford Encyclopedia of Philosophy and a member of the Norwegian Academy of Science and Letters.

Early life
Pogge received his PhD from Harvard University with a dissertation supervised by John Rawls. Since then, he has published widely on Immanuel Kant and in moral and political philosophy, including various books on Rawls and global justice.

Major works

The Health Impact Fund: Making New Medicines Accessible for All (2008)
In this book, Thomas Pogge and Aidan Hollis argue in favour of establishing the Health Impact Fund (HIF).  The HIF is a new proposal for stimulating research and development of life-saving pharmaceuticals that make substantial reductions in the global burden of disease.

The HIF will provide pharmaceutical companies with a new choice. Pharmaceutical companies can sell a new medicine in the usual manner at patent-protected high prices, or they can choose to register their new medicine with the HIF and sell it globally at the cost of production.  If they choose to register their medicine with the HIF, the pharmaceutical company will receive additional payments from the fund that are proportionate to health improvements that are brought about by the registered medicines. The more effective the medicine is in improving global health, the bigger the payout. Because malaria kills millions, the firm that finds and develops a cure can expect a significant return.

World Poverty and Human Rights (2002, 2008)
Pogge's World Poverty and Human Rights (2002) includes a number of original and substantial theses, the most notable being that people in wealthy Western liberal democracies (such as Western Europeans) are currently harming the world's poor (like those in sub-Saharan Africa).  In particular, without denying that much blame should be directed at domestic kleptocrats, Pogge urges us to recognize the ways in which international institutions facilitate and exacerbate the corruption perpetuated by national institutions.  Pogge is especially critical of the “resource” and “borrowing” privileges,  which allow illegitimate political leaders to sell natural resources and to borrow money in the name of the country and its people.  In Pogge's analysis, these resource and borrowing privileges that international society extends to oppressive rulers of impoverished states play a crucial causal role in perpetuating absolute poverty.  What is more, Pogge maintains that these privileges are no accident; they persist because they are in the interest of the wealthy states. The resource privilege helps guarantee a reliable supply of raw materials for the goods enjoyed by the members of wealthy states, and the borrowing privilege allows the financial institutions of wealthy states to issue lucrative loans.  It may seem that such loans are good for developing states too, but Pogge argues that, in practice, they typically work quite to the contrary:

Local elites can afford to be oppressive and corrupt, because, with foreign loans and military aid, they can stay in power even without popular support.  And they are often so oppressive and corrupt, because it is, in light of the prevailing extreme international inequalities, far more lucrative for them to cater to the interests of foreign governments and firms than to those of their impoverished compatriots.

Realizing Rawls (1989)
In Realizing Rawls, Pogge defends, criticizes and extends John Rawls's A Theory of Justice (1971).  Pogge insists that Rawls has been importantly misunderstood by his most influential critics, including the libertarian Robert Nozick  and the communitarian Michael Sandel. According to Pogge, Rawls’ reluctance to disagree sharply with his critics has helped these (mis)understandings to become widespread, and has also induced Rawls in his more recent work to dilute the moral statement of his central Rawlsian ideas:  first, that moral deliberation must begin from reflection upon the justice of our basic social institutions; and second, that the justice of an institutional scheme is to be assessed by how well its least advantaged participants fare.  From these starting points, Pogge develops his own specification of Rawls's principles of justice, discussing the relative importance of different fundamental rights and liberties, the ideal constitution of the political process, and the just organization of educational, health-care, and economic institutions.  In the last part of the book, Pogge argues for extending the Rawlsian criterion of justice to the international arena,  and identifies those features of the present global order that this criterion would single out as principal targets for institutional reform.

Other projects

Giving What We Can
Pogge deeply influenced Toby Ord in founding Giving What We Can, an effective altruism organization whose members pledge to give at least 10% of their income to effective charities. The aim of the organization is to encourage people to commit to long-term donations to those charities that provide the most cost-effective good. 

In addition, he became a member of the organization since its beginnings in 2009.

Incentives for Global Health (IGH)
IGH is a non-profit organization dedicated to developing market-based, systemic solutions to health challenges faced by the world's poor. Its flagship proposal is the Health Impact Fund.

Academics Stand Against Poverty (ASAP)

Academics Stand Against Poverty is an organization meant to help academics have a greater impact on world poverty. “The group lies between academia and activism. Like the latter, it aims primarily at persuading and motivating people to change their behavior. Like the former, it does so by moral and political argument, using the distinctive skills of academics.”

This project is still in its beginning stages.  It has three central aims:
 To disseminate accessible versions of arguments for taking action against world poverty to the public;
 To disseminate responses to standard objections to such arguments to the public; 
 To distribute discussion of what individuals and states in developing countries should do in response to world poverty to the public.

Poverty and gender equality measurement
Various indices - the United Nations Development Programme's Human and Gender‐Related Development Indices, and the World Bank’s Poverty Index - are used to track poverty, development, and gender equity at the population level. Pogge argues that these prominent indices are deeply flawed and therefore distort our moral judgments and misguide resource allocations by governments, international agencies, and non-governmental organizations.

“This project will work toward new indices ‘of poverty and of gender equity’ applicable both at the national and supranational levels, and to smaller groups affected by specific policies and programs. Both indices will draw on a holistic measure of individual (dis)advantage that reflects all relevant aspects of a person's situation.”

Pogge has pursued similar themes in Politics as Usual: What Lies Behind the Pro-Poor Rhetoric (2010).

Illicit financial flows
This project focuses on the illicit financial flows out of developing countries, the lack of transparency in the global financial system, and the impact these conditions have on human rights.  The driving idea behind this project is that “‘human rights and international financial integrity are intimately linked’” and that poverty increases when money flows out of nations illicitly instead of being invested in the basic needs of people in their countries.”

Forced Labor and Human Trafficking
The Forced Labor and Human Trafficking project aims "to bring public, official, and mainstream media attention to the global crisis of human trafficking and labor abuse towards children and adults." The non-profit organization Art Works Projects is a contributor to this project.

Sexual harassment allegations

As a professor at Columbia University in the mid-1990s, Pogge had been disciplined by the school following allegations of sexual harassment. He was later hired by Yale University. In 2010, Pogge was accused in a high-profile sexual harassment case of by a recent Yale graduate, Fernanda Lopez Aguilar. Aguilar was represented by sexual harassment and discrimination lawyer Ann Olivarius. The university cleared Pogge of misconduct. Afterwards, 169 philosophy professors from several countries, including many in Pogge's own academic department at Yale, signed an open letter condemning his behavior and asking the U.S. Department of Education's Office for Civil Rights to investigate Yale's response. Some of the professors who signed the letter pledged to skip conferences in which Pogge is involved and to remove his work from their curricula. Pogge wrote a detailed defense. In 2019, the Yale Daily News reported a graduate student stating that Pogge continuing to teach undergraduates was a “source of difficulty” and that his presence was cause of "persistent unrest among the graduate students.”

Bibliography
Thomas Pogge, Politics as Usual: What Lies Behind the Pro-Poor Rhetoric (Cambridge: Polity Press 2010)
Thomas Pogge, The Health Impact Fund: Making New Medicines Accessible for All, authored with Aidan Hollis (Incentives for Global Health, 2008) 
Thomas Pogge, World Poverty and Human Rights: Cosmopolitan Responsibilities and Reforms, 2nd ed. (Cambridge: Polity Press 2008)
Thomas Pogge, Realizing Rawls (Ithaca: Cornell University Press 1989)
Ed. Thomas Pogge, Freedom from Poverty as a Human Right (Who owes what to the very poor?) (Oxford: Oxford University Press 2007)

See also

 Global Resources Dividend

References

External links

 Global Justice Program
 Pogge’s home page
 'Globalization, Rights and Poverty,' Considered at Center for the Study of Human Rights 25th Anniversary Conference, October 23, 2003
 UNU Lecture Series ‘Emerging Thinking on Global Issues (II)’: Human Rights: The Second 60 Years, and interview, December 11, 2008
 RSA Lecture 'Ending Poverty', December 18, 2012
 KUOW 94.9 FM Weekday: Thomas Pogge on Poverty and Global Justice, April 17, 2009

1953 births
Living people
Harvard University alumni
20th-century German philosophers
21st-century German philosophers
Members of the Norwegian Academy of Science and Letters
German ethicists
Social philosophers
Political philosophers
Yale University faculty
Columbia University faculty
Academic staff of Charles Sturt University
German male writers